Giovanni Francesco Setario (died 1516) was a Roman Catholic prelate who served as Bishop of Avellino e Frigento (1510–1516).

Biography
On 11 January 1510, Giovanni Francesco Setario was appointed during the papacy of Pope Leo X as Bishop of Avellino e Frigento. He served as Bishop of Avellino e Frigento until his death in 1516.

References

External links and additional sources
 (for Chronology of Bishops) 
 (for Chronology of Bishops) 

16th-century Italian Roman Catholic bishops
Bishops appointed by Pope Leo X
1516 deaths